Ora Graves (July 26, 1896 – September 28, 1961) was a sailor in the United States Navy who received the Medal of Honor for his actions during World War I.

Biography
Graves was born in Las Animas, Colorado, on July 26, 1896. He died September 28, 1961, and is buried in Fort Rosecrans National Cemetery San Diego, California.  His gravesite is located in section W grave 1208.

Medal of Honor citation
Rank and organization: Seaman, U.S. Navy. Born: 26 July 1896, Los Animas, Colo. Accredited to: Nebraska. G.O. No.: 366, 1918.

Citation:

For extraordinary heroism on 23 July 1917, while the U.S.S. Pittsburgh was proceeding to Buenos Aires, Argentina. A 3-inch saluting charge exploded, causing the death of C. T. Lyles, seaman. Upon the explosion, Graves was blown to the deck, but soon recovered and discovered burning waste on the deck. He put out the burning waste while the casemate was filled with clouds of smoke, knowing that there was more powder there which might explode.

See also

List of Medal of Honor recipients
List of Medal of Honor recipients for World War I

References

External links

United States Navy Medal of Honor recipients
United States Navy sailors
United States Navy personnel of World War I
People from Las Animas, Colorado
Military personnel from Colorado
1896 births
1961 deaths
World War I recipients of the Medal of Honor
Burials at Fort Rosecrans National Cemetery